Lorrain is a language (often referred to as patois) spoken by now a minority of people in Lorraine in France, small parts of Alsace and in Gaume in Belgium. It is a langue d'oïl.

It is classified as a regional language of France and has the recognised status of a regional language of Wallonia, where it is known as Gaumais. It has been influenced by Lorraine Franconian and Luxembourgish, West Central German languages spoken in nearby or overlapping areas.

Features 
Linguist Stephanie Russo noted the difference of a 'second' imperfect and pluperfect tense between Lorrain and Standard French. It is derived from Latin grammar that no longer is used in modern French.

Variations 
The Linguasphere Observatory distinguishes seven variants :

 Argonnais (Argonne, Woëvre, eastern French Ardennes, Meuse, Meurthe-et-Moselle)
 Longovician (Longwy, Longuyon, northern Meurthe-et-Moselle)
 Gaumais (arrondissement of Virton, cantons of Montmédy and Stenay in Meuse and the canton of Carignan in Ardennes)
 Messin (Metz, Metzgau and all of French-speaking Moselle)
 Nancéien (Nancy, southern Meurthe-et-Moselle)
 Spinalian (Épinal, central Vosges)
 Deodatian (Saint-Dié, Hautes-Vosges)

After 1870, members of the Stanislas Academy in Nancy noted 132 variants of Lorrain from Thionville in the north to Rupt-sur-Moselle in the south, which means that main variants have sub-variants.

See also
 Welche dialect
 Ban de la Roche region
 Language policy of France

External links
 http://www.travelphrases.info/languages/lorrain.htm
  Essai sur le patois lorrain des environs du comté du Ban de la Roche, Jeremias Jacob Oberlin, 1775

References 

Oïl languages
Languages of France
Languages of Belgium
Walloon culture
Luxembourg (Belgium)